The Ponte Vecchio is a stone and brick arch bridge over the Dora Baltea in Ivrea, Italy.

History 
Archaeological studies have shown that a bridge existed in this site as far back as at time of the Romans.

The bridge was destroyed and reconstructed several times across the centuries due to floods.

In 1707, it was demolished during the French siege of Ivrea to better defend the town. In 1716, Victor Amadeus II ordered its reconstruction. The bridge was later widened in 1830 by Charles Felix to improve traffic inflow and outflow from Ivrea. Nonetheless, in 1860 an additional bridge, the Ponte Isabella, had to be built next to it to provide for additional capacity.

Description 
The structure consists of a triple-arch stone and brick bridge.

Gallery

References

External links

Bridges in Piedmont
Arch bridges
Buildings and structures in Ivrea
Vecchio
Tourist attractions in Piedmont